Below are the results of the 2018 World Series of Poker, held from May 30-July 17 at the Rio All Suite Hotel and Casino in Las Vegas, Nevada.

Key

Results

Source:

Event #1: $565 Casino Employees No Limit Hold'em

 2-Day Event: May 30–31
 Number of Entries: 566
 Total Prize Pool: $283,000
 Number of Payouts: 85
 Winning Hand:

Event #2: $10,000 No Limit Hold'em Super Turbo Bounty

 1-Day Event: May 30
 Number of Entries: 243
 Total Prize Pool: $2,284,200
 Number of Payouts: 37
 Winning Hand:

Event #3: $3,000 No Limit Hold'em Shootout

 3-Day Event: May 31-June 2
 Number of Entries: 363
 Total Prize Pool: $980,100
 Number of Payouts: 50
 Winning Hand:

Event #4: $1,500 Omaha Hi-Lo 8 or Better

 4-Day Event: May 31-June 3
 Number of Entries: 911
 Total Prize Pool: $1,229,850
 Number of Payouts: 137
 Winning Hand:

Event #5: $100,000 No Limit Hold'em High Roller

 4-Day Event: June 1–4
 Number of Entries: 105
 Total Prize Pool: $10,185,000
 Number of Payouts: 16
 Winning Hand:

Event #6: $365 Giant No Limit Hold'em

 7-Day Event: June 1, 8, 15, 22, 29-July 1
 Number of Entries: 8,920
 Total Prize Pool: $2,676,000
 Number of Payouts: 1,797
 Winning Hand:

Event #7: $565 Colossus No Limit Hold'em

 6-Day Event: June 2–7
 Number of Entries: 13,070
 Total Prize Pool: $6,535,000
 Number of Payouts: 1,754
 Winning Hand:

Event #8: $2,500 Mixed Triple Draw Lowball

 3-Day Event: June 4–6
 Number of Entries: 321
 Total Prize Pool: $722,250
 Number of Payouts: 49
 Winning Hand: 
 Note: Includes A-5, 2-7 and Badugi

Event #9: $10,000 Omaha Hi-Lo 8 or Better Championship

 4-Day Event: June 3–6
 Number of Entries: 169
 Total Prize Pool: $1,588,600
 Number of Payouts: 26
 Winning Hand:

Event #10: $365 WSOP.com Online No Limit Hold'em

 1-Day Event: June 3 
 Number of Entries: 2,972
 Total Prize Pool: $974,816
 Number of Payouts: 333
 Winning Hand:

Event #11: $365 Giant Pot Limit Omaha

 7-Day Event: June 3, 10, 17, 24, July 1–3 
 Number of Entries: 3,250
 Total Prize Pool: $975,000
 Number of Payouts: 464
 Winning Hand:

Event #12: $1,500 Dealers Choice 6-Handed

 3-Day Event: June 4–6
 Number of Entries: 406
 Total Prize Pool: $548,100
 Number of Payouts: 61
 Winning Hand:  (Big O)

Event #13: $1,500 Big Blind Antes No Limit Hold'em

 4-Day Event: June 5–8
 Number of Entries: 1,306
 Total Prize Pool: $1,763,100
 Number of Payouts: 196
 Winning Hand:

Event #14: $1,500 No Limit 2-7 Lowball Draw

 3-Day Event: June 5–7
 Number of Entries: 260
 Total Prize Pool: $351,000
 Number of Payouts: 39
 Winning Hand:

Event #15: $1,500 H.O.R.S.E.

 4-Day Event: June 6–9
 Number of Entries: 731
 Total Prize Pool: $986,850
 Number of Payouts: 110
 Winning Hand: 9-2-4-Q-A-4-8 (Razz)

Event #16: $10,000 Heads Up No Limit Hold'em Championship

 3-Day Event: June 6–8
 Number of Entries: 114
 Total Prize Pool: $1,071,600
 Number of Payouts: 8
 Winning Hand:

Event #17: $1,500 No Limit Hold'em 6-Handed

 4-Day Event: June 7–10
 Number of Entries: 1,663
 Total Prize Pool: $2,245,050
 Number of Payouts: 250
 Winning Hand:

Event #18: $10,000 Dealers Choice 6-Handed

 3-Day Event: June 7–9
 Number of Entries: 111
 Total Prize Pool: $1,043,400
 Number of Payouts: 17
 Winning Hand:  (Stud Hi-Lo)

Event #19: $565 Pot Limit Omaha

 3-Day Event: June 8–10
 Number of Entries: 2,419
 Total Prize Pool: $1,209,500
 Number of Payouts: 354
 Winning Hand:

Event #20: $5,000 Big Blind Antes No Limit Hold'em

 4-Day Event: June 8–11
 Number of Entries: 518
 Total Prize Pool: $2,408,700
 Number of Payouts: 78
 Winning Hand:

Event #21: $1,500 Millionaire Maker No Limit Hold'em

 6-Day Event: June 9–14
 Number of Entries: 7,361
 Total Prize Pool: $9,937,350
 Number of Payouts: 1,105
 Winning Hand:

Event #22: $1,500 Eight Game Mix

 3-Day Event: June 9–11
 Number of Entries: 481
 Total Prize Pool: $649,350
 Number of Payouts: 73
 Winning Hand: Q-2-A-6-5-3-2 (Razz)

Event #23: $10,000 No Limit 2-7 Lowball Draw Championship

 3-Day Event: June 10–12
 Number of Entries: 95
 Total Prize Pool: $893,000
 Number of Payouts: 15
 Winning Hand: 9-8-7-6-2

Event #24: $2,620 The Marathon No Limit Hold'em

 5-Day Event: June 11–15 
 Number of Entries: 1,637
 Total Prize Pool: $3,860,046
 Number of Payouts: 246
 Winning Hand:

Event #25: $1,500 Seven Card Stud Hi-Lo 8 or Better

 3-Day Event: June 11–13
 Number of Entries: 596
 Total Prize Pool: $804,600
 Number of Payouts: 90
 Winning Hand:

Event #26: $1,000 Pot Limit Omaha

 3-Day Event: June 12–14
 Number of Entries: 986
 Total Prize Pool: $887,400
 Number of Payouts: 148
 Winning Hand:

Event #27: $10,000 H.O.R.S.E.

 3-Day Event: June 12–14
 Number of Entries: 166 
 Total Prize Pool: $1,560,400
 Number of Payouts: 25
 Winning Hand:  (Limit Hold'em)

Event #28: $3,000 No Limit Hold'em 6-Handed

 4-Day Event: June 13–16
 Number of Entries: 868
 Total Prize Pool: $2,343,600
 Number of Payouts: 131
 Winning Hand:

Event #29: $1,500 Limit 2-7 Lowball Triple Draw

 3-Day Event: June 13–15
 Number of Entries: 356
 Total Prize Pool: $480,600
 Number of Payouts: 54
 Winning Hand: 9-6-5-3-2

Event #30: $1,500 Pot Limit Omaha

 3-Day Event: June 14–16
 Number of Entries: 799
 Total Prize Pool: $1,078,650
 Number of Payouts: 120
 Winning Hand:

Event #31: $1,500 Seven Card Stud

 3-Day Event: June 14–16
 Number of Entries: 310
 Total Prize Pool: $418,500
 Number of Payouts: 47
 Winning Hand:

Event #32: $1,000 Seniors No Limit Hold'em

 4-Day Event: June 15–18
 Number of Entries: 5,919
 Total Prize Pool: $5,327,100
 Number of Payouts: 888
 Winning Hand:

Event #33: $50,000 Poker Players Championship

 5-Day Event: June 15–19 
 Number of Entries: 87
 Total Prize Pool: $4,176,000
 Number of Payouts: 14
 Winning Hand:  (No Limit Hold'em)

Event #34: $1,000 Double Stack No Limit Hold'em

 6-Day Event: June 16–21 
 Number of Entries: 5,700
 Total Prize Pool: $5,130,000
 Number of Payouts: 855
 Winning Hand:

Event #35: $1,500 Mixed Omaha

 3-Day Event: June 16–18
 Number of Entries: 773
 Total Prize Pool: $1,043,550
 Number of Payouts: 116
 Winning Hand:

Event #36: $1,000 Super Seniors No Limit Hold'em

 4-Day Event: June 17–20
 Number of Entries: 2,191
 Total Prize Pool: $1,971,900
 Number of Payouts: 329
 Winning Hand:

Event #37: $1,500 No Limit Hold'em

 4-Day Event: June 18–21
 Number of Entries: 1,330
 Total Prize Pool: $1,795,500
 Number of Payouts: 200
 Winning Hand:

Event #38: $10,000 Seven Card Stud Championship

 3-Day Event: June 18–20
 Number of Entries: 83
 Total Prize Pool: $780,200
 Number of Payouts: 13
 Winning Hand:

Event #39: $1,500 No Limit Hold'em Shootout

 3-Day Event: June 19–21
 Number of Entries: 908
 Total Prize Pool: $1,225,800
 Number of Payouts: 100
 Winning Hand:

Event #40: $2,500 Mixed Big Bet

 3-Day Event: June 19–21
 Number of Entries: 205
 Total Prize Pool: $461,250
 Number of Payouts: 31
 Winning Hand:  (Big O)

Event #41: $1,500 Limit Hold'em

 3-Day Event: June 20–22
 Number of Entries: 596
 Total Prize Pool: $804,600
 Number of Payouts: 90
 Winning Hand:

Event #42: $25,000 Pot Limit Omaha High Roller

 4-Day Event: June 20–23 
 Number of Entries: 230
 Total Prize Pool: $5,462,500
 Number of Payouts: 35
 Winning Hand:

Event #43: $2,500 No Limit Hold'em

 4-Day Event: June 21–24
 Number of Entries: 1,248
 Total Prize Pool: $2,808,000
 Number of Payouts: 188
 Winning Hand:

Event #44: $10,000 Limit 2-7 Lowball Triple Draw Championship

 3-Day Event: June 21–23
 Number of Entries: 109
 Total Prize Pool: $1,024,600
 Number of Payouts: 17
 Winning Hand: 7-6-5-4-2

Event #45: $1,000 Big Blind Antes No Limit Hold'em

 2-Day Event: June 22–23 
 Number of Entries: 1,712
 Total Prize Pool: $1,540,800
 Number of Payouts: 257
 Winning Hand:

Event #46: $2,500 Mixed Omaha/Seven Card Stud Hi-Lo 8 or Better

 3-Day Event: June 22–24
 Number of Entries: 402
 Total Prize Pool: $904,500
 Number of Payouts: 61
 Winning Hand:

Event #47: $565 WSOP.com Online Pot Limit Omaha 6-Handed

 1-Day Event: June 22 
 Number of Entries: 1,223
 Total Prize Pool: $635,960
 Number of Payouts: 99
 Winning Hand:

Event #48: $1,500 Monster Stack No Limit Hold'em

 5-Day Event: June 23–27 
 Number of Entries: 6,260
 Total Prize Pool: $8,451,000
 Number of Payouts: 939
 Winning Hand:

Event #49: $10,000 Pot Limit Omaha 8-Handed Championship

 4-Day Event: June 23–26
 Number of Entries: 476
 Total Prize Pool: $4,474,400
 Number of Payouts: 72
 Winning Hand:

Event #50: $1,500 Razz

 3-Day Event: June 24–26
 Number of Entries: 389
 Total Prize Pool: $525,150
 Number of Payouts: 59
 Winning Hand: 4-3-Q-9-7-6-Q

Event #51: $1,500 No Limit Hold'em Bounty

 4-Day Event: June 25–28
 Number of Entries: 1,983
 Total Prize Pool: $2,677,050
 Number of Payouts: 298
 Winning Hand:

Event #52: $10,000 Limit Hold'em Championship

 3-Day Event: June 25–27
 Number of Entries: 114
 Total Prize Pool: $1,071,600
 Number of Payouts: 18
 Winning Hand:

Event #53: $1,500 Pot Limit Omaha Hi-Lo 8 or Better

 3-Day Event: June 26–28
 Number of Entries: 935
 Total Prize Pool: $1,262,250
 Number of Payouts: 141
 Winning Hand:

Event #54: $3,000 Big Blind Antes No Limit Hold'em

 4-Day Event: June 26–29
 Number of Entries: 1,020
 Total Prize Pool: $2,754,000
 Number of Payouts: 153
 Winning Hand:

Event #55: $1,000 Tag Team No Limit Hold'em

 3-Day Event: June 27–29
 Number of Entries: 1,032
 Total Prize Pool: $928,800
 Number of Payouts: 155
 Winning Hand:

Event #56: $10,000 Razz Championship

 4-Day Event: June 27–30
 Number of Entries: 119
 Total Prize Pool: $1,118,600
 Number of Payouts: 18
 Winning Hand: 3-2-2-7-4-Q-5

Event #57: $1,000/$10,000 Ladies No Limit Hold'em Championship

 3-Day Event: June 28–30
 Number of Entries: 696
 Total Prize Pool: $626,400
 Number of Payouts: 105
 Winning Hand:

Event #58: $5,000 No Limit Hold'em 6-Handed

 4-Day Event: June 28-July 1 
 Number of Entries: 621
 Total Prize Pool: $2,887,650
 Number of Payouts: 94
 Winning Hand:

Event #59: $1,000 No Limit Hold'em Super Turbo Bounty

 1-Day Event: June 29
 Number of Entries: 2,065
 Total Prize Pool: $1,858,500
 Number of Payouts: 310
 Winning Hand:

Event #60: $10,000 Pot Limit Omaha Hi-Lo 8 or Better Championship

 3-Day Event: June 29-July 1
 Number of Entries: 237
 Total Prize Pool: $2,227,800
 Number of Payouts: 36
 Winning Hand:

Event #61: $1,000 WSOP.com Online No Limit Hold'em Championship

 1-Day Event: June 29
 Number of Entries: 1,635
 Total Prize Pool: $1,553,250
 Number of Payouts: 180
 Winning Hand:

Event #62: $888 Crazy Eights No Limit Hold-em

 5-Day Event: June 30-July 5
 Number of Entries: 8,598
 Total Prize Pool: $6,871,521
 Number of Payouts: 1,218
 Winning Hand:

Event #63: $3,200 WSOP.com Online No Limit Hold'em High Roller

 1-Day Event: June 30
 Number of Entries: 480
 Total Prize Pool: $1,459,200
 Number of Payouts: 63
 Winning Hand:

Event #64: $10,000 Seven Card Stud Hi-Lo 8 or Better Championship

 3-Day Event: July 1–3
 Number of Entries: 141
 Total Prize Pool: $1,325,400
 Number of Payouts: 22
 Winning Hand:

Event #65: $10,000 No Limit Hold'em Main Event

 13-Day Event: July 2–14
 Number of Entries: 7,874
 Total Prize Pool: $74,015,600
 Number of Payouts: 1,182
 Winning Hand:

Event #66: $1,500 No Limit Hold'em

 4-Day Event: July 5–8
 Number of Entries: 1,351
 Total Prize Pool: $1,823,850
 Number of Payouts: 203
 Winning Hand:

Event #67: $1,500 Pot Limit Omaha Bounty

 3-Day Event: July 6–8
 Number of Entries: 833
 Total Prize Pool: $708,050
 Number of Payouts: 125
 Winning Hand:

Event #68: $1,000 + 111 The Little One for One Drop No Limit Hold'em

 5-Day Event: July 7–11
 Number of Entries: 4,732
 Total Prize Pool: $4,258,800
 Number of Payouts: 710
 Winning Hand:

Event #69: $3,000 Pot Limit Omaha 6-Handed

 3-Day Event: July 8–10
 Number of Entries: 901
 Total Prize Pool: $2,432,700
 Number of Payouts: 136
 Winning Hand:

Event #70: $3,000 Limit Hold'em 6-Handed

 3-Day Event: July 9–11
 Number of Entries: 221
 Total Prize Pool: $596,700
 Number of Payouts: 34
 Winning Hand:

Event #71: $5,000 No Limit Hold'em

 2-Day Event: July 10–11
 Number of Entries: 452
 Total Prize Pool: $2,101,800
 Number of Payouts: 68
 Winning Hand:

Event #72: $1,500 Mixed No Limit Hold'em/Pot Limit Omaha 8-Handed

 3-Day Event: July 10–12
 Number of Entries: 707
 Total Prize Pool: $954,450
 Number of Payouts: 107
 Winning Hand:

Event #73: $1,000 Double Stack No Limit Hold'em

 2-Day Event: July 11–12
 Number of Entries: 1,221
 Total Prize Pool: $1,098,900
 Number of Payouts: 184
 Winning Hand:

Event #74: $10,000 Big Blind Antes No Limit Hold'em 6-Handed Championship

 3-Day Event: July 11–13
 Number of Entries: 355
 Total Prize Pool: $3,337,000
 Number of Payouts: 54
 Winning Hand:

Event #75: $1,500 The Closer No Limit Hold'em

 4-Day Event: July 12–15
 Number of Entries: 3,120
 Total Prize Pool: $4,212,000
 Number of Payouts: 457
 Winning Hand:

Event #76: $3,000 H.O.R.S.E.

 3-Day Event: July 12–14
 Number of Entries: 354
 Total Prize Pool: $955,800
 Number of Payouts: 54
 Winning Hand:  (Omaha Hi-Lo)

Event #77: $50,000 Big Blind Ante No Limit Hold'em High Roller

 2-Day Event: July 13–14 
 Number of Entries: 128
 Total Prize Pool: $6,144,000
 Number of Payouts: 20
 Winning Hand:

Event #78: $1,000,000 The Big One for One Drop No Limit Hold'em

 3-Day Event: July 15–17
 Number of Entries: 27
 Total Prize Pool: $24,840,000
 Number of Payouts: 5
 Winning Hand:

External links
Official website

References

World Series of Poker
World Series of Poker Results, 2018